The following is a list of Louisville Cardinals men's basketball head coaches. There have been 22 head coaches of the Cardinals in their 109-season history.

Louisville's current head coach is Kenny Payne. He was hired as the Cardinals' head coach in March 2022, replacing Chris Mack, who was fired in January 2022.

References

Louisville

Louisville Cardinals basketball, men's, coaches